Per ("Pelle") Vilhelm Wikström (born 29 June 1961 in Borlänge, Dalarna) is a former Swedish swimmer who competed in the 1980 Summer Olympics, where he finished 9th in the 100 metres freestyle. He is also father to Swedish swimmers Christoffer and Sebastian Wikström.

Clubs
Borlänge SS

References
 sports-reference

Living people
Swimmers at the 1980 Summer Olympics
Olympic swimmers of Sweden
1961 births
People from Borlänge Municipality
Swedish male freestyle swimmers
World Aquatics Championships medalists in swimming
European Aquatics Championships medalists in swimming
Borlänge SS swimmers
Sportspeople from Dalarna County